Marvin Lee Minsky (August 9, 1927 – January 24, 2016) was an American cognitive and computer scientist concerned largely with research of artificial intelligence (AI), co-founder of the Massachusetts Institute of Technology's AI laboratory, and author of several texts concerning AI and philosophy.

Minsky received many accolades and honors, including the 1969 Turing Award.

Biography
Marvin Lee Minsky was born in New York City, to an eye surgeon father, Henry, and to a mother, Fannie (Reiser), who was a Zionist activist. His family was Jewish. He attended the Ethical Culture Fieldston School and the Bronx High School of Science. He later attended Phillips Academy in Andover, Massachusetts. He then served in the US Navy from 1944 to 1945. He received a B.A. in mathematics from Harvard University in 1950 and a Ph.D. in mathematics from Princeton University in 1954. His doctoral dissertation was titled "Theory of neural-analog reinforcement systems and its application to the brain-model problem." He was a Junior Fellow of the Harvard Society of Fellows from 1954 to 1957.

He was on the MIT faculty from 1958 to his death. He joined the staff at MIT Lincoln Laboratory in 1958, and a year later he and John McCarthy initiated what is, named the MIT Computer Science and Artificial Intelligence Laboratory.  He was the Toshiba Professor of Media Arts and Sciences, and professor of electrical engineering and computer science.

Contributions in computer science 

Minsky's inventions include the first head-mounted graphical display (1963) and the confocal microscope (1957, a predecessor to today's widely used confocal laser scanning microscope).  He developed, with Seymour Papert, the first Logo "turtle".  Minsky also built, in 1951, the first randomly wired neural network learning machine, SNARC. In 1962, Minsky worked on small universal Turing machines and published his well-known 7-state, 4-symbol machine.

Minsky's book Perceptrons (written with Seymour Papert) attacked the work of Frank Rosenblatt, and became the foundational work in the analysis of artificial neural networks. The book is the center of a controversy in the history of AI, as some claim it to have had great importance in discouraging research of neural networks in the 1970s, and contributing to the so-called "AI winter". He also founded several other AI models. His paper A framework for representing knowledge created a new paradigm in knowledge representation. While his Perceptrons is now more a historical than practical book, the theory of frames is in wide use. Minsky also wrote of the possibility that extraterrestrial life may think like humans, permitting communication.

In the early 1970s, at the MIT Artificial Intelligence Lab, Minsky and Papert started developing what came to be known as the Society of Mind theory.  The theory attempts to explain how what we call intelligence could be a product of the interaction of non-intelligent parts.  Minsky says that the biggest source of ideas about the theory came from his work in trying to create a machine that uses a robotic arm, a video camera, and a computer to build with children's blocks.  In 1986, Minsky published The Society of Mind, a comprehensive book on the theory which, unlike most of his previously published work, was written for the general public.

In November 2006, Minsky published The Emotion Machine, a book that critiques many popular theories of how human minds work and suggests alternative theories, often replacing simple ideas with more complex ones.  Recent drafts of the book are freely available from his webpage.

Role in popular culture
Minsky was an adviser on Stanley Kubrick's movie 2001: A Space Odyssey; one of the movie's characters, Victor Kaminski, was named in Minsky's honor. Minsky is mentioned explicitly in Arthur C. Clarke's derivative novel of the same name, where he is portrayed as achieving a crucial break-through in artificial intelligence in the then-future 1980s, paving the way for HAL 9000 in the early 21st century:

In Fargo Season 3 episode 3 (titled "The Law of Non-Contradiction"), at least two allusions are made to Minsky.  The first, through the depiction of a "useless machine": a device that was invented by Minsky as a philosophical joke.  The second, through the depiction of an animation of a robot called "minsky" - a character in a sci-fi novel called "The Planet Wyh".

Personal life

In 1952, Minsky married pediatrician Gloria Rudisch; together they had three children. Minsky was a talented improvisational pianist who published musings on the relations between music and psychology.

Opinions
Minsky was an atheist. He was a signatory to the Scientists' Open Letter on Cryonics.

He was a critic of the Loebner Prize for conversational robots, and argued that a fundamental difference between humans and machines was that while humans are machines, they are machines in which intelligence emerges from the interplay of the many unintelligent but semi-autonomous agents that comprise the brain. He argued that "somewhere down the line, some computers will become more intelligent than most people," but that it was very hard to predict how fast progress would be. He cautioned that an artificial superintelligence designed to solve an innocuous mathematical problem might decide to assume control of Earth's resources to build supercomputers to help achieve its goal, but believed that such negative scenarios are "hard to take seriously" because he felt confident that AI would go through a lot of testing before being deployed.

Association with Jeffrey Epstein

Minsky received a $100,000 research grant from Jeffrey Epstein in 2002, four years before Epstein's first arrest for sex offenses; it was the first from Epstein to MIT. Minsky received no further research grants from him.

Minsky organized two academic symposia on Epstein's private island Little Saint James, one in 2002 and another in 2011, after Epstein was a registered sex offender. Virginia Giuffre testified in a 2015 deposition in her defamation lawsuit against Epstein's associate Ghislaine Maxwell that Maxwell "directed" her to have sex with Minsky among others. There has been no allegation that sex between them took place nor a lawsuit against Minsky's estate.  Minsky's widow, Gloria Rudisch, says that he could not have had sex with any of the women at Epstein's residences, as they were always together during all of the visits to Epstein's residences.

Death
In January 2016 Minsky died of a cerebral hemorrhage, at the age of 88. Minsky was a member of Alcor Life Extension Foundation's Scientific Advisory Board. Alcor will neither confirm nor deny whether Minsky was cryonically preserved.

Bibliography (selected)
 1967 – Computation: Finite and Infinite Machines, Prentice-Hall
 1986 – The Society of Mind
 2006 – The Emotion Machine: Commonsense Thinking, Artificial Intelligence, and the Future of the Human Mind

Awards and affiliations
Minsky won the Turing Award (the greatest distinction in computer science) in 1969, the Golden Plate Award of the American Academy of Achievement in 1982, the Japan Prize in 1990, the IJCAI Award for Research Excellence for 1991, and the Benjamin Franklin Medal from the Franklin Institute for 2001. In 2006, he was inducted as a Fellow of the Computer History Museum "for co-founding the field of artificial intelligence, creating early neural networks and robots, and developing theories of human and machine cognition." In 2011, Minsky was inducted into IEEE Intelligent Systems' AI Hall of Fame for the "significant contributions to the field of AI and intelligent systems". In 2014, Minsky won the Dan David Prize  for "Artificial Intelligence, the Digital Mind". He was also awarded with the 2013 BBVA Foundation Frontiers of Knowledge Award in the Information and Communication Technologies category.

Minsky was affiliated with the following organizations:
 United States National Academy of Engineering
 United States National Academy of Sciences
 Extropy Institute's Council of Advisors
 Alcor Life Extension Foundation's Scientific Advisory Board
 kynamatrix Research Network's Board of Directors

Media appearances
 Future Fantastic (1996)
 Machine Dreams (1988)

See also
 List of pioneers in computer science

Notes

References

External links

 Oral history interview with Marvin Minsky at Charles Babbage Institute, University of Minnesota, Minneapolis.  Minsky describes artificial intelligence (AI) research at the Massachusetts Institute of Technology (MIT). Topics include: the work of John McCarthy; changes in the MIT research laboratories with the advent of Project MAC; research in the areas of expert systems, graphics, word processing, and time-sharing; variations in the Advanced Research Projects Agency (ARPA) attitude toward AI.
 Oral history interview with Terry Winograd at Charles Babbage Institute, University of Minnesota, Minneapolis.  Winograd describes his work in computer science, linguistics, and artificial intelligence at the Massachusetts Institute of Technology (MIT), discussing the work of Marvin Minsky and others.
 Scientist on the Set: An Interview with Marvin Minsky
 Marvin Minsky Playlist  Appearance on WMBR's Dinnertime Sampler  radio show November 26, 2003
 Consciousness Is A Big Suitcase: A talk with Marvin Minsky
 Video of Minsky speaking at the International Conference on Complex Systems, hosted by the New England Complex Systems Institute (NECSI)
 "The Emotion Universe": Video with Marvin Minsky
 Marvin Minsky's thoughts on the Fermi Paradox at the Transvisions 2007 conference
 "Health, population and the human mind" : Marvin Minsky talk at the TED conference
 "The Society of Mind" on MIT OpenCourseWare
 Marvin Minsky tells his life story at Web of Stories (video)

1927 births
2016 deaths
Jewish American atheists
American computer scientists
20th-century American Jews
United States Navy personnel of World War II
Artificial intelligence researchers
American consciousness researchers and theorists
Cryonically preserved people
Ethical Culture Fieldston School alumni
Fellows of the Association for the Advancement of Artificial Intelligence
Harvard College alumni
Harvard Fellows
Massachusetts Institute of Technology faculty
Members of the United States National Academy of Engineering
Members of the United States National Academy of Sciences
Phillips Academy alumni
Princeton University alumni
Scientists from New York City
The Benjamin Franklin Medal in Computer and Cognitive Science laureates
The Bronx High School of Science alumni
Turing Award laureates
Fellows of the Cognitive Science Society
MIT Lincoln Laboratory people
MIT Media Lab people
Presidents of the Association for the Advancement of Artificial Intelligence
21st-century American Jews